Wavrans may refer to two communes in the Pas-de-Calais department in northern France:
 Wavrans-sur-l'Aa
 Wavrans-sur-Ternoise